Xerom Civil (born 13 April 1996) is a Spanish rugby union player who plays as a hooker for Agen in the Top 14. He also has caps playing for the Spanish National Rugby Union side. Although born in France, Civil holds dual nationality with Spain.

Rugby Union Career

Civil began playing rugby at Union Bordeaux Bègles, where he rose to prominence as a rugby union prop in their youth side. He made his full senior debut during the 2016-17 Top 14 season. Civil dropped down a division to play for Carcassonne in Pro D2 the following season. Civil was signed by Agen for the 2018-19 Top 14 season. After just one Top 14 season Civil returned to Carcassonne ahead of the 2019-2020 French rugby union season. 

Civil holds dual nationality and could have played for France but opted for Spain. He made his international debut on 21 November 2015 in Spain against Chile at Torrelavega.

References

External links
Agen Profile

1994 births
Living people
Spanish rugby union players
SU Agen Lot-et-Garonne players
Rugby union hookers
Spain international rugby union players